Alice Auma (1956 – 17 January 2007) was an Acholi spirit-medium who, as the head of the Holy Spirit Movement (HSM), led a millennial rebellion against the Ugandan government forces of President Yoweri Museveni from August 1986 until November 1987. The primary spirit she purportedly channelled was that of a dead army officer called "Lakwena", meaning messenger, which the Acholi believe to be a manifestation of the Christian Holy Spirit. The combined persona of Alice Auma channelling the spirit Lakwena is often referred to as "Alice Lakwena". Auma's HSM was ultimately defeated in November 1987 by Ugandan forces led by Yoweri Museveni.

Early life
Alice Auma was born in 1956. Leader of the Lord's Resistance Army Joseph Kony previously claimed that Auma and he were cousins, however, he merely did so in order to garner support from her constituents. Auma herself always distanced herself from Kony and his views.

Career
Remaining childless after two marriages, she moved away from her hometown. She eventually converted to Christianity but, on 25 May 1985, she reportedly went insane, unable to either hear or speak, later claiming to have been possessed by the spirit Lakwena. Her father took her to eleven different witches, but none alleviated her condition. Auma claimed Lakwena then guided her to Paraa National Park, where she disappeared for 40 days and returned a spirit-medium, a traditional ethnic religious role.

Before the defeat of Tito Okello, Auma was one of many spirit-mediums working near the town of Gulu as a minor oracle and spiritual healer. She worked in the midst of the chaos of the anti-National Resistance Army (NRA) insurgency of the Uganda People's Democratic Army and the increasingly brutal counterinsurgency of the NRA. Legend in the later movement holds that on 6 August 1986, Lakwena ordered Auma to stop her work as a diviner and healer, which was pointless in the midst of war, and create a Holy Spirit Movement (HSM) to fight evil and end the bloodshed. This divine mission required the retaking of the capital of Kampala. Thus the Acholi would redeem themselves from the violence they had collectively imposed on the civilians of the Luwero triangle, and would initiate a paradise on earth. A letter to local missionaries explained the transition:

The good Lord who had sent the Lakwena decided to change his work from that of a doctor to that of a military commander for one simple reason: it is useless to cure a man today only that he be killed the next.  So it became an obligation on his part to stop the bloodshed before continuing his work as a doctor.

Auma claimed that Lakwena required that she be possessed by numerous other spirits to achieve its goals. This was unusual in Acholi spirit-behavior.

At this time, there was a perceived spiritual crisis in the area coinciding with the threat posed by occupying southern forces. The increased level of societal tension and number of deaths were attributed to witchcraft. Moreover, many soldiers fleeing back into Acholi after their defeat at Kampala refused traditional purification ceremonies. These rituals were believed to protect the community from the vengeful spirits of the people the soldiers had killed, but the elders found that they no longer had the authority to force compliance with the convention.

After a series of spectacular victories, Auma led the Holy Spirit Movement (HSM) south out of Acholiland towards Kampala. There, she garnered much support from other ethnic groups that had grievances with Yoweri Museveni's government. However, subsequent military setbacks suffered by the HSM prompted some followers to accuse Auma of being a witch and of using spirits for destructive ends. As the HSM suffered its final defeat under artillery fire in the forests near Kampala, Auma fled and claimed that Lakwena had left her.

Later life
Auma lived in the Ifo refugee camp near Dadaab in northern Kenya for the remainder of her life, and claimed to have been abandoned by the spirits. In November 2004, she was implicated in child trafficking from Gulu to the refugee camp. In 2006, she claimed to have discovered a cure for HIV/AIDS. Auma died on 17 January 2007, after having been sick for about a week with an unknown illness claimed to be HIV/AIDS.

The Tale of Paraa

Although Auma's practice as a medium immediately after returning to Gulu was not particularly successful, the tale of Paraa became the central text of the HSM. In particular Lakwena's discourse that the insurgency was a rebellion of nature deserves explication. According to the story, Lakwena first held court with all the animals of the park to explore the theme of the ongoing war in the south and the destruction of the environment by warring parties:Lakwena said to the animals: "You animals, God sent me to ask you whether you bear responsibility for the bloodshed in Uganda." The animals denied blame, and the buffalo displayed a wound on his leg, and the hippopotamus displayed a wound on his arm.

Lakwena then questioned the water about the war:Lakwena said to the waterfall: "Water, I am coming to ask you about the sins and bloodshed in this world." And the water said: "The people with two legs kill their brothers and throw their bodies into the water." The spirit asked the water what it did with the sinners, and the water said: "I fight against the sinners, for they are the ones to blame for the bloodshed. Go and fight against the sinners, because they throw their brothers into the water."

After briefly returning home, Lakwena led Auma to Mount Kilak to deal with the issue of witchcraft. The mountain greeted their arrival with large explosions:The spirit Lakwena said to the mountain or to the rock: "God has sent me to find out why there is theft in the world." The mountain answered: "I have gone nowhere and have stolen no one's children. But people come here to me and name the names of those whom I should kill [by casting spells]. Some ask me for medicine [to bewitch]. This is the sin of the people. I want to give you water to heal diseases. But you must fight against the sinners."

In the climax to the story, God himself specifies who is to blame for all of the suffering and bloodshed:God said that there was a tribe in Uganda that was hated everywhere. This tribe was the Acholi. And God ordered that a lamb be offered, so that they should repent their sins and to put an end to the bloodshed in Acholi.

See also 

 Joseph Kony
 Tito Okello
 Vincent Otti
 Caesar Achellam
 Okot Odhiambo

References

Bibliography
 Alice Lakwena and the Holy Spirits: War in Northern Uganda, 1985–97, James Currey, 2000. . Mitch Cohen, trans.  (Originally published as Behrend, H.  1993.  Alice und die Geister: Krieg in Norden Uganda.  Trickster, Munich.)

External links
 "Resistance Army Leader in Kenya after 'Holy War'" (streaming audio) by Eric Westervelt, National Public Radio'''s Weekend Edition Saturday, 12 November 2005
 "Uganda's mystic rebel leader dies", BBC News Online, 17 January 2007
 Rebel leader was seen as 'spiritual medium', Mail & Guardian''
 "SOLDIER BOYS" Joseph Kony and the Lord's Resistance Army Video made in 2000 for CTV (Canada), featuring an interview with Alice Lakwena.

1956 births
2007 deaths
20th-century Christian mystics
21st-century Christian mystics
Acholi people
African women in war
People from Gulu District
Protestant mystics
Ugandan Christian mystics
Ugandan rebels
Women in warfare post-1945